Stow-on-the-Wold railway station was a station on the Great Western Railway's Banbury and Cheltenham Direct Railway that opened in 1881. Situated about one and a half miles to the south the station served the Gloucestershire town of Stow-on-the-Wold and its surrounding villages. The station passed on to the Western Region of British Railways on nationalisation in 1948. It was then closed by the British Transport Commission.

Stationmasters
George Tibbs until 1900
James Dowler 1900 - 1923 (formerly station master at Notgrove)
G.J. Fifield 1923 - 1932 (formerly station master at Broadway)
E.G. Unitt from 1932 (formerly station master at Awre)

External links
 Station on 1947 OS Map

References

Former Great Western Railway stations
Disused railway stations in Gloucestershire
Railway stations in Great Britain opened in 1881
Railway stations in Great Britain closed in 1962
1881 establishments in England
Stow-on-the-Wold
Cotswold District